The 1938 United States Senate election in Missouri took place on November 8, 1938 in Missouri. The incumbent Democratic Senator, Bennett Champ Clark, was re-elected with 60.69% of the vote. He defeated Republican candidate and former Governor of Missouri Henry S. Caulfield.

Democratic primary

Candidates
 Bennett Champ Clark, the incumbent Senator
 Joseph T. Davis, lawyer
 Willis H. Meredith, former member of the Missouri House of Representatives for Butler County and former Speaker of House
Robert I. Young, farmer

Results

Republican primary

Candidates
 Henry S. Caulfield, former Governor of Missouri
 Ray E. White, real estate dealer

Results

Other candidates
The Socialist Party of America nominated J. G. Hodges, who was the party's nominee in the 1932 Senate election. The Socialist Labor Party of America nominated Karl L. Oberhue.

Results

References

1938
Missouri
United States Senate